The mesonephric duct, also known as the Wolffian duct, archinephric duct, Leydig's duct or nephric duct, is a paired organ that develops in the early stages of embryonic development in humans and other mammals. It is an important structure that plays a critical role in the formation of male reproductive organs. The duct is named after Caspar Friedrich Wolff, a German physiologist and embryologist who first described it in 1759.

During embryonic development, the mesonephric duct forms as a part of the urogenital system.

Structure 
The mesonephric duct connects the primitive kidney, the mesonephros, to the cloaca. It also serves as the primordium for male urogenital structures including the epididymis, vas deferens, and seminal vesicles.

Development 
In both male and female the mesonephric duct develops into the trigone of urinary bladder, a part of the bladder wall, but the sexes differentiate in other ways during development of the urinary and reproductive organs.

Male 

In a male, it develops into a system of connected organs between the efferent ducts of the testis and the prostate, namely the epididymis, the vas deferens, and the seminal vesicle. The prostate forms from the urogenital sinus and the efferent ducts form from the mesonephric tubules.

For this it is critical that the ducts are exposed to testosterone during embryogenesis. Testosterone binds to and activates androgen receptor, affecting intracellular signals and modifying the expression of numerous genes.

In the mature male, the function of this system is to store and mature sperm, and provide accessory semen fluid.

Female 

In the female, with the absence of anti-Müllerian hormone secretion by the Sertoli cells and subsequent Müllerian apoptosis, the mesonephric duct regresses, although inclusions may persist. The epoophoron and Skene's glands may be present. Also, lateral to the wall of the vagina a Gartner's duct or cyst could develop as a remnant.

Function

Sexual differentiation

History
It is named after Caspar Friedrich Wolff who described the mesonephros and its ducts in his dissertation in 1759.

Additional images

See also 
 Fetal genital development
 List of homologues of the human reproductive system
 Masculinization
 Müllerian duct
 Sexual differentiation

References

External links
 How the Body Works / Sex Development / Sexual Differentiation / Duct Differentiation - The Hospital for Sick Children (GTA - Toronto, Ontario, Canada)

Embryology of urogenital system